Ya with macron (Я̄ я̄; italics: Я̄ я̄) is a letter of the Cyrillic script.

Ya with macron is used in the Aleut (Bering dialect), Evenki, Ingush, Mansi, Nanai, Negidal, Ulch, Kildin Sami, Selkup and Chechen languages.

References

See also
Cyrillic characters in Unicode

Cyrillic letters with diacritics
Letters with macron